Scott Anderson (born 1959) is an American novelist, non-fiction author, and war correspondent. He has authored non-fiction books including Lawrence in Arabia, The Man Who tried to Save the World, and War Zones, as well as the novels Triage and Moonlight Hotel. He is a frequent contributor to the New York Times Magazine, GQ, Esquire, Men's Journal, Vanity Fair and other publications.

Biography 
Anderson grew up in East Asia, primarily in Taiwan and Korea, where his father was an agricultural advisor for the American government. His career began with a 1994 article in Harper's Magazine on the Northern Ireland events. The 2007 movie The Hunting Party starring Richard Gere and Terrence Howard, is partially based on his work in Bosnia. The 2009 drama film Triage starring Colin Farrell, Paz Vega and Sir Christopher Lee, is based on his novel. Lawrence in Arabia narrates the experiences of T. E. Lawrence in Arabia and explores the complexity of the Middle East.

His brother is Jon Lee Anderson, an author and journalist, and they have co-authored two books. Anderson currently lives in Brooklyn, New York.

GQ article controversy 
In a September 2009 issue of GQ, Anderson wrote an article supporting the theory of Putin's role in the Russian apartment bombings, based in part on his interviews with Mikhail Trepashkin. The journal owner, Condé Nast, then took extreme measures to prevent an article by Anderson from appearing in the Russian media, both physically and in translation. According to the NPR, Anderson was asked not to syndicate the article to any Russian publications, but told GQ he would refuse the request.

Awards and honors
2013 National Book Critics Circle Award (Biography) shortlist for Lawrence in Arabia: War, Deceit, Imperial Folly and the Making of the Modern Middle East

Bibliography

Non-fiction
 Inside the League. With Jon Lee Anderson (Dodd Mead, 1986 )
 War Zones. With Jon Lee Anderson (Dodd Mead, 1988 )
 The 4 O'Clock Murders (Doubleday, 1992 )
 The Man who Tried to Save the World (Anchor, 2000 )
 Lawrence in Arabia. (Doubleday, 2013 )
 Fractured Lands. (Anchor, 2017 )
 The Quiet Americans. (Penguin Random House, 2020 )

Select articles

Fiction
 Triage (Scribner 1999 )
 Moonlight Hotel (Doubleday 2006 )

References

External links 

Living people
American war correspondents
20th-century American novelists
20th-century American male writers
Gainesville High School (Florida) alumni
21st-century American novelists
American military writers
Place of birth missing (living people)
American male novelists
21st-century American male writers
20th-century American non-fiction writers
21st-century American non-fiction writers
American male non-fiction writers
1959 births